The 1959–60 Eastern Professional Hockey League season was the first season of the Eastern Professional Hockey League, a North American minor professional league. Six teams participated in the regular season, and the Montreal Royals were the league champions.

Regular season

Playoffs

External links
 Statistics on hockeydb.com

Eastern Professional Hockey League (1959–1963) seasons
EPHL